Egge is a small village in Lier in Buskerud, Norway. It is the location of Egge Farm (Egge Gård) which is noted for its fruit orchards.

References

External links

Villages in Buskerud